Davina McCall's Language of Love is a British dating reality television show in which contestants try to form relationships with partners who speak a different language.

The show has eight episodes and airs weekly on Channel 4. It features male and female contestants, each of whom only speak either English or Spanish. The contestants stay together in a villa in Spain and each is paired with another contestant who speaks a different language from them. In each episode, an event called the Seleccion allows some contestants to change the person they are paired with. For the most part, contestants communicate through the language barrier using dictionaries, gestures and so on. However some couples can gain access to a special area called the Zona Romantica where they can communicate more freely using simultaneous interpretation.

References

2022 British television series debuts
2020s British reality television series
British dating and relationship reality television series
English-language television shows
Channel 4 reality television shows
Television shows filmed in Spain
Television shows set in Spain